Proselena is a genus of moths belonging to the subfamily Tortricinae of the family Tortricidae.

Species
Proselena annosana Meyrick, 1881
Proselena tenella (Meyrick, 1910)
Proselena thamnas (Meyrick, 1910)

See also
List of Tortricidae genera

References

External links
tortricidae.com

Tortricidae genera